Farlowella gianetii is a species of catfish in the family Loricariidae. It is native to South America, where it occurs in the upper Xingu River basin in the state of Mato Grosso in Brazil. The species reaches at least 12.1 cm (4.8 inches) in standard length. It was described in 2016 by Gustavo A. Ballen (of the University of London), Murino N. L. Pastana (of the Smithsonian Institution), and Luiz Peixoto (of the University of São Paulo). Its specific name, gianetii, honors Dr. Michel Donato Gianeti, manager of the ichthyological collections of the University of São Paulo. FishBase does not yet list this species.

References 

gianetii
Fish described in 2016
Catfish of South America
Freshwater fish of Brazil